Play Tour is the debut concert tour headlined by Spanish singer Aitana to promote her debut album Spoiler. The tour began on June 22, 2019 in Murcia and has visited bullrings, parks, amphitheatres and arenas. An extension to the tour, title + Play Tour, was added on February 7, 2020 and was set to begin on May 23, 2020 in Valencia and to conclude on December 20 at the WiZink Center in Madrid comprising 37 concerts. However, on May 29, the singer announced the cancellation of the remaining tour stops. The Barcelona concert was recorded for the live album Play Tour: En Directo (2020).

Background 
At the beginning of 2019, Aitana hinted a solo tour via social media. On March 1, 2019, Aitana announced through her social media, her participation at the 2019 Cap Roig Festival, which made her fans think that her highly anticipated solo tour might only be a festival one. Those rumors increased when, six days later, the singer announced her headlining gig at the 2019 Universal Music Festival. On March 14, 2019, the singer was interviewed at the 2019 Premios Dial red carpet. There, she announced that her first solo tour would begin around summer. This will be her first headlining tour as her 2018 OT 2017 in concierto concert tour was a joint one with her Operación Triunfo mates. She also let the press know that she had no clue of what the dates were; that her record label was still planning the tour's route, In late March, she announced four intimate acoustic shows sponsored by Los40, which she called a "pre-tour familiar shows". On April 4, Aitana finally announced through her social media that her debut tour would be called "Play Tour" and that it would promotion her 2018 EP Tráiler, as well as her first studio album, which was released in June 2019. Its first 12 dates were announced that same day, Aitana's Play Tour began on June 22, 2019 at the Plaza de Toros, in Murcia. On June 3, Aitana announced her biggest concert to date at the Palau Sant Jordi, Spain's largest indoor arena which sold-out in less than five hours. This concert, as well as the Granada and the October show in Madrid were recorded for the tour documentary included in the album reissue Spoiler: Re-Play.

In December 2019, Aitana announced that an extension of the tour would be revealed earlier next year. Thus, on February 7, 2020 she announced the second part of it, which she named + Play Tour (in reference to her single "+") and revealed its first 6 dates. It was set to begin on May 23, 2020 at Valencia's bullring but was delayed due to the COVID-19 pandemic. This concert was set to take place on May 30 but was advanced due to unknown reasons even though fans believe that the reason of the date change is the coincidence with a Miriam Rodríguez (fellow friend of Aitana) show in the city and then moved to September 13. Thus, the extension is set to begin on June 12 in Almería. More national and international dates will be announced throughout the year.

On May 29, 2020, Aitana announced that all the "+ Play Tour" dates besides de Madrid December concert were cancelled due to the ongoing pandemic. A new tour will be programmed for 2021. The remaining tour date in Madrid was reschudeled to December 7, 2021 as part of her new tour. The decision was announced on October 27.

Critical and commercial reception 
Different newspapers and music professionals have reviewed the singer's debut concert tour. They all agree that it is a "true musical party starring one of the best voices in the country" and that "the Catalan singer is able to show in her show, energy and feeling embraced in pope bases and melodies that pass through different genres, all of them under the umbrella of a mainstream sound, either in its more urban layer or in its more melodic themes where the Artist proves to have a special voice color".

The tour's most attended show to date was the August 22nd show in Fuengirola which attracted over 11,500 fans to the Marenostrum Castle Park, an outdoor venue with a makeshift amphitheatre. When the tickets for the October shows in Madrid and Barcelona were made available on August 21, 2019, both sold-out in less than a day. Therefore, more tickets were released to meet the demand. Almost every show of the tour surpasses the 75% of attendance. When tickets for the final show in the WiZInk Center were released on February 14, 2020, over 80% of the tickets were sold in less than a day, which pushed the singer and her team to expand the ticket offer.

Recordings 
Every tour stop had its own mini documentary, which was less than two minutes long. Those were posted on YouTube some time after the concert took place and follows Aitana backstage, walking down the city, getting ready and performing. At the end of the tour's first leg, multiple shows were recorded in order to make an extense tour special documentary. This one was included in the Spoiler reissue, Spoiler: Re-Play, released exclusively in physical editions on December 20, 2019. This documentary in particular includes footage from the arena shows in Madrid, Barcelona and Granada, which took place between October and December of that year.

On July 24, 2020, Aitana's first live album and DVD will be released in physical stores under the name Play Tour: En Directo. This one captures the singer's biggest concert yet, the Palau Sant Jordi gig in Barcelona. On November 6, 2020, a short documentary titled "Play Tour: Detrás de las Luces" premiered on Movistar +.

Set list 

"Teléfono"
"Stupid"
"Mejor Que Tú"
"Perdimos la Razón"
"Barro y Hielo"
"Las Vegas"
"Arde"
"Nada Sale Mal"
"Presiento"
"Someone Like You" (Adele cover)
"Popcorn"
"Cristal"
"Chandelier" (Sia cover)
"Issues" (Julia Michaels cover)
"Bang Bang" (Jessie J, Ariana Grande and Nicki Minaj cover)
"Con la Miel en los Labios"
"Hold"
"Vas a Quedarte"
"Me Quedo"
"Procuro Olvidarte" (Alejandro Fernández cover)
"Lo Malo"

Tour dates

Cancelled shows

Notes

References 

2019 concert tours
2020 concert tours